Brannock may refer to:

 Brannoc of Braunton or Saint Brannock, a 6th-century Christian saint associated with North Devon
 Charles F. Brannock (1903 – 1992), shoe salesman and inventor of the Brannock Device
 Mike Brannock (1851 – 1881), American baseball player
 Brannock High School, Motherwell, Scotland
 Brannock Device, a shoe-size measuring instrument
 Brannock, County Armagh, a townland in County Armagh, Northern Ireland

See also

 Brannoch (disambiguation)